Manual For Successful Rioting is the third album by French electronic turntable band Birdy Nam Nam. Released in 2009 with Has Been and Jive Sbme Europe on CD and LP formats, the record features production by Yuksek and includes co-production by Justice. On 5 December 2008 they performed at Transmusicales de Rennes. In which the definitive version of The Parachute Ending was released.
The album was intended to be released in December 2008, but for unknown reasons was released in 2009.

Track listing

External links
 Birdy Nam Nam official website
 Birdy Nam Nam on MySpace
 Animated music video for "The Parachute Ending" on Vimeo

2009 albums